Mougins is a commune in the Alpes-Maritimes department in the Provence-Alpes-Côte d'Azur region in Southeastern France. In 2019, it had a population of 19,982.

It is located on the heights of Cannes, in the arrondissement of Grasse. Mougins is a 15-minute drive from Cannes. The town is surrounded by forests, most notably the Valmasque forest. In the town there are pines, olives and cypress trees.

History
The hilltop of Mougins has been occupied since the pre-Roman period. Ancient Ligurian tribes who inhabited the coastal area between Provence and Tuscany, were eventually absorbed into the spread of the Roman Empire and then became part of an official Ligurian state that was created by Emperor Augustus (X Regio). On the Aurelia way linking from Rome to Arles, Muginum came into being during the 1st century BC.

In 1056, Gillaume de Gauceron, the Count of Antibes, gave the Mougins hillside to the Monks of Saint Honorat (from the nearby Îles de Lerins just off the coast of Cannes) who continued to administer the village, and until the eve of the French Revolution in 1789 its history matched that of the abbey. The former monks' court house, a vaulted room that is now called the  "Salle des Moines" ("The Monk's Hall") was located on the first floor of the restaurant L'Amandier.

Built 260 m up at the top of the peak, the village was fortified in the Middle Ages. Its spiral form, its ramparts and its three gates, of which only the Porte Sarrazine (Sarrazine Gate) still exists today, gave this fiefdom a strategic position despite the many wartime attacks over the course of its history. The village grew outside its old fortifications, while still adhering to the circular structure of the ramparts.

During the 18th-century War of the Austrian Succession, the village was plundered by the Austro-Sardinian armies and damaged by fire. Following this, some of the ramparts were deconstructed and several new little streets of early 19th-century houses were built.

Personalities
On 1 March 1815, Napoleon Bonaparte, exiled until this time on the island of Elba, landed on the beaches of Golfe-Juan with his troops. The emperor began the “One Hundred Day’s March” to return to Paris and seize power. He crossed Mougins to join Grasse, Digne, Gap and Grenoble.

Commandant Amédée-François Lamy was born in Mougins in February 1858, and died at the Battle of Kousséri in Chad in April 1900. Fort-Lamy in Chad was named after him, but was renamed N'Djamena in 1973. The main 'Place' in the village is named after Commandant Lamy and the back-street village house that he was born in has a plaque to show where he lived.

In modern times, Mougins has been frequented and inhabited by many important personalities.

The exile Volodymyr Vynnychenko, former Prime Minister of Ukraine, lived in Mougins from 1934 until his death in 1951.

In 1924, the surrealist painter Francis Picabia built his home here. His famous friends followed, and turn set up home in Mougins: Fernand Léger, Paul Éluard, Robert Desnos, Jean Cocteau, Isadora Duncan, Man Ray and Pablo Picasso. Pablo Picasso spent the last 12 years of his life living in Mougins (1961–1973), where he died and lived in a 'mas' (farmhouse) at Notre-Dame-de-Vie, which is a small hilltop just beside the old village of Mougins and next to the 12th-century chapel of the same name. Picasso's studio was in the old village in a building that is now the tourist office, while the studio of Fernand Léger was above what is now the village wine shop, next to the rear of the Mougins Museum of Classical Art (MACM).

Sir Winston Churchill liked to sit in the middle of nature in front of the Notre-Dame-de-Vie chapel to write, very close to his neighbour Pablo Picasso, who used to come and set up his easel here.

Arman, Elizabeth von Arnim, Yves Klein, César Baldaccini Yves Saint Laurent, Christian Dior, Catherine Deneuve, Édith Piaf, Jacques Brel, were other artists who drew their artistic inspiration from Mougins in the 20th century.

Mougins has a strong culinary history with such great chefs as Roger Vergé and Alain Ducasse having managed restaurants in the village. 
The legendary hospitality of chef Roger Vergé and his wife Denise attracted the greatest international stars to their Michelin starred restaurants: Elizabeth Taylor, Sharon Stone, Sean Connery...

Given its close proximity to Cannes, Mougins is also often the tourist destination for Hollywood stars during the Cannes Film Festival. Dame Elizabeth Taylor hosted the 'amfAR' AIDS Charity dinner for the Hollywood elite for almost 10 years until 2008.

Gastronomy
Mougins has an important culinary history, with chef Roger Vergé, having owned two restaurants in the village: L'Amandier et Le Moulin de Mougins. In 1969, Vergé came to Mougins. A true pioneer: he dusted off and lightened French cuisine. He invented the “Cuisine du Soleil” (Sunshine Cuisine) that he introduced across the globe, contributing to the growing reputation of French cuisine. He was awarded 5 stars by the Michelin Guide for his two restaurants. 
 
 L'Amandier: Roger Vergé owned L'Amandier for over twenty years, while also training another of the world's greatest contemporary chefs, Alain Ducasse, who worked for Roger Vergé in Mougins from 1977-1981, and ultimately worked as a chef here. The first floor of L’Amandier is still known as ‘Les Salles des Moines’ (The Monk's Hall) as it served as court house for the Monks of Saint Honorat in the Middle Ages. By the 19th century, this building had become a mill, pressing flowers grown on the hillsides of Mougins, to supply rose, jasmine and lavender oil for the perfumeries of the nearby village of Grasse.

 Le Moulin de Mougins: At Le Moulin de Mougins Roger Vergé hosted the very first AMFAR Gala, a charity event to which celebrities flocked, contributing to the town's gastronomic reputations. Consequently, in the 1970s, Mougins boasted 7 Michelin stars and became the village with the most stars in France. A friend of the arts and artists, over the years Vergé transformed his restaurant into a living museum with works by his friends César Baldaccini, Arman, Folon or Tobiasse.

In order to pay homage to the chef Roger Vergé, in 2006, the Mayor of Mougins, Richard Galy, decided to create the very first International Gastronomy Festival, the 'Les Étoiles de Mougins'.

Since 2012, Mougins has been the only town in France to be awarded the “Ville et Métier d’Art” label for gastronomy.

Cultural facilities

Mougins Museum of Classical Art

The Musée d’Art Classique de Mougins, also known as MACM, is the Mougins Museum of Classical Art. The museum displays within the same space ancient, neoclassical, modern, and contemporary art in order to highlight the influence of the ancient world on influential artists from Sir Peter Paul Rubens to Damien Hirst. Located at the entrance of the village of Mougins, the private museum holds a collection of over 800 works over four floors. The MACM focuses on the reciprocal influences of the ancient civilisations of Egypt, Rome, and Greece, and the continuity of the Graeco-Roman legacy through to the present. Its collection includes artefacts from ancient Egypt, Greece and Rome, as well as drawings, paintings, and sculptures by Paul Cézanne, Marc Chagall, Pablo Picasso, Auguste Renoir, Jean Cocteau, Salvador Dalí, Raoul Dufy, Antony Gormley, Keith Haring, Damien Hirst, Henri Matisse, Henry Moore, Francis Picabia, Marc Quinn, Auguste Rodin, and Henri Toulouse-Lautrec.

Mougins Photography Centre
Located in the center of an old village, in an old rehabilitated presbytery, the Mougins Photography Centre aims to highlight the many trends in contemporary photography.

Le Lavoir (Wash house)
Built in 1894, this historic place houses temporary exhibitions throughout the year.

Cultural centre
Located above the town hall's marriage registration office, it houses temporary exhibitions and a series of unreleased photos of Pablo Picasso, taken during this everyday life at Notre-Dame-de-Vie.

Performing arts
In 2017, the "Scène 55" cultural space was opened to host concerts, theatre and puppet theatre shows, and artistic workshops. 
In summer, the "Festival Notre-Dame-de-Vie" hosts a festival of classical music in the setting of the eponymous chapel. 
In the village, the Organ Festival takes places every year in the church of Saint-Jaques-le-Majeur and the open-air exhibition "Mougins Monumental" brings unusual and large sculptures to the village.

Demographics

Economy
During the 19th and early 20th centuries, the village was a centre of floral production, producing lavender, roses and jasmine for the perfumeries in nearby Grasse. Mougins is a living village, where both the ancient buildings and the 19th-century houses are inhabited as they have always been.

Education
Mougins School, the more commonly used name for the Mougins British International School international school has been in operation since it was established in 1964.
There is an elementary school "les cabrieres" and a middle school "les campelieres".

Mayors

Twin towns
Mougins is twinned with:

  Aschheim, Germany
  Lerici, Italy

See also
 Communes of the Alpes-Maritimes department
 Bernard Lancret
 Johann Michael Rottmayr
 Pablo Picasso

References

External links

 Mougins Museum of Classical Art
 Page with photos of the old village of Mougins
 La Vigne de Pibonson is the only Wine producing estate in Mougins and one of only 3 in Alpes-Maritimes

Communes of Alpes-Maritimes
Alpes-Maritimes communes articles needing translation from French Wikipedia